Mordex is an extinct genus of temnospondyls from Carboniferous of the Czech Republic.

See also

 Prehistoric amphibian
 List of prehistoric amphibians

References

Dissorophids
Prehistoric amphibian genera
Carboniferous temnospondyls of Europe
Fossil taxa described in 1938